Nappa may refer to:

Places 
Nappa, Finland, a village in northern Kymenlaakso
Nappa, North Yorkshire, a village in England
Nappa Hall, North Yorkshire, England

People 
Francisco Nappa ( 1928), Maltese water polo player.
Mike Nappa (born 1963), American author

Fictional characters 

 Nappa, a character in Dragon Ball media
Antonio Nappa, a character in TV series Oz, played by Mark Margolis

Other uses 
Nappa cabbage or napa cabbage, a type of Chinese cabbage
Nappa leather, a full-grain leather

See also
Napa (disambiguation)

ja:ナッパ